The Armed Forces of Serbia and Montenegro (ВСЦГ / VSCG) included ground forces with internal and border troops, naval forces, air and air defense forces, and civil defense. Preceding the VSCG was the Yugoslav Army (1992–2003) from the remnants of the Yugoslav People's Army (JNA), the military of SFR Yugoslavia. The state, then named Federal Republic of Yugoslavia, participated in the Yugoslav Wars with limited direct intervention of its own armed forces. Following the end of the Wars and the constitutional reforms of 2003 by which the state was renamed "Serbia and Montenegro", the military accordingly changed its name. The military was heavily involved in combating Albanian separatists during the Kosovo War and Preševo Valley conflict, and also engaged NATO airplanes during the 1999 NATO bombing of Yugoslavia.

Upon the dissolution of Serbia and Montenegro with the Montenegrin independence referendum (2006), a fraction of the joint military was given to Montenegro, with the bulk of the force remaining in Serbia. Montenegro inherited the navy as Serbia is landlocked.

Organization

VJ
The Armed Forces of Yugoslavia (VJ) was organized into the following:

Ground Forces
1st Army
Novi Sad Corps
Belgrade Command
Kragujevac Corps
Independent units
2nd Army
Podgorica Corps
Užice Corps
Independent units
3rd Army
Niš Corps
Leskovac Corps
Priština Corps
Independent units

Navy

War Command
Flotilla
81st
83rd
85th
108th
110th
82nd
69th
367th
9th
10th
27th
61st
223rd
9th

Air Force

VSCG

Ground Forces

Inventory

Ground Forces

Armoured vehicles
M-84
T-55A-~750
M-80A
BTR-50
BRDM-2
BOV

Artillery
M-46
M-56
M-84 Nora-A
D-30
2S1 Gvozdika
M-63
M-77

Air Defence
Bofors 40 mm gun L/70
M53/59 Praga – 100–200
SA-7
SA-14
SA-18
SA-9
SA-13
SA-3
SA-6

Infantry weapons
CZ-99 Pistol 9 mm
M70A/M70B1 Assault Rifles 7.62 mm
M93 Black Arrow Long Range Rifle
BGA
M76 7.9 mm Sniper rifle
M72 7.62 mm Machine gun
M84 7.62 mm Machine gun
M87 12.7 mm Heavy Machine gun
AT-3 Sagger
AT-4 Spigot
M79 "Osa" 90 mm
M80 "Zolja" 64 mm rocket grenade launcher

Air Force
 

The inventory included MiG-21 (fighter/recon/trainer), MiG-29 (fighter/trainer), Soko J-22 (ground/recon/trainer), Soko G-2 (fighter/bomber/trainer), Soko G-4 (fighter/bomber/target/trainer, Antonov An-2 (cargo), Antonov An-26 (cargo), Yakovlev Yak-40 (VIP), Mil Mi-8 (multirole), Mil Mi-14 (anti-submarine), Kamov Ka-25 (anti-submarine), Kamov Ka-28 (anti-submarine), Aérospatiale Gazelle (attack/utility/recon).

Navy 

The Navy, known as the Yugoslav Navy from 1992 to 2003 and the Navy of Serbia and Montenegro from 2003 to 2006, was based in Kotor and was largely made of vessels inherited from the pre-1992 Federal Yugoslav Navy. During NATO's Operation Allied Force in 1999, the Navy took control over civilian shipping around Kotor, despite NATO's blockade and in several actions the navy's warships fired at NATO aircraft that were on their way to strike Yugoslav targets. The Navy claimed to have shot down three UAVs over Boka Kotorska. The images of the remains of one of them were displayed online.

Koni-class frigate (2)
Kotor-class frigate (2)
Heroj-class submarine (3)
Sava-class submarine (2)
Una-class submarine (5)
Končar-class missile boat (6)
Osa class missile boat (10)
Jadran sailboat
Neštin class minesweeper (7)
Kozara river ship

Intelligence
 Security Administration

Operational experience
Croatian War and Bosnian War (1992–1995), unofficially, logistical support and supplies
Insurgency in Kosovo (27 May 1995 – 28 February 1998), belligerent, counter-terrorism
Kosovo War (28 March 1998 – 11 June 1999), including NATO bombing of Yugoslavia (23 March – 10 June 1999), belligerent
Insurgency in the Preševo Valley (12 June 1999 – 1 June 2001), belligerent, counter-terrorism

Statistics
 
Civilians fit for military service were estimated at about 4,888,595 (2001 est.). The 2002 estimate for military expenditures as percent of GDP was 4.6%. Significant reforms were undertaken in the military of Serbia and Montenegro. In 2002 the Serbo-Montenegrin Military force numbered around 117,500 soldiers, supported by some 450,000 reserves. The 100,000 strong Army had 1,500 main battle tanks and 687 armed infantry vehicles. The Navy had 3,500 personnel, of whom 900 were marines. The entire Navy was composed totally out of 6 submarines, 3 frigates, 41 patrol & coastal ships and 14 "other" vessels. The Air force 14,000 personnel had 192 combat aircraft and 72 armed helicopters.

Branches
Army or Ground Forces (Kopnena vojska – KoV VSCG)
Air Force and Air Defense (Ratno Vazduhoplovstvo i Protivvazdušna odbrana – RV i PVO VSCG)
Navy (Ratna Mornarica – RM VSCG)

Military manpower – military age: 19 years of age (2003 est.)

Military manpower – availability:
males age 15–49: 3,579,620 (2003 est.)

Military manpower – fit for military service:
males age 15–49: 3,077,660 (2003 est.)

Military manpower – reaching military age annually:
males: 101,547 (2003 est.)

Military expenditures – dollar figure: $954 million (2002)

Military expenditures – percent of GDP: 4.6% (2002. est.)

International deployment
The VSCG was part of MONUC, the UN mission in the Congo. The VSCG was also part of UNAMSIL, the UN mission into Sierra Leone.

Last chief of staff of the Military of Serbia and Montenegro was general Ljubiša Jokić.

See also

Yugoslav People's Army
Destruction of Albanian heritage in Kosovo

Notes

References

External links
 Yugoslavia Ground Forces
 Serbian and Montenegrin Armed Forces / Vojska Srbije i Crne Gore – VSCG
 Army of Yugoslavia / Vojska Jugoslavije
 The Great Secret of Serbian Military Affair, which covers the time when Serbia and Montenegro was in the state union
 Encyclopedia of the Nations

 
Military units and formations established in 1992
Disbanded armed forces